Andreas Bredau (born 21 March 1984) is a German bobsledder who has competed since 2005. His best World Cup finish was second in the four-man event at St. Moritz in January 2010.

Bredau finished seventh in the four-man event at the 2010 Winter Olympics in Vancouver.

References

1984 births
Living people
People from Saxony-Anhalt
German male bobsledders
Bobsledders at the 2010 Winter Olympics
Olympic bobsledders of Germany